Te Papanui Conservation Park is a mainland island in the Otago Region of New Zealand.

It is managed by the Department of Conservation, and opened in its current form in March 2003.

See also
 Mainland islands

References

Protected areas of Otago